Péricles Aparecido Fonseca de Faria, also known as Péricles, or Periclão (born in Santo André, July 22, 1969), is a brazilian singer, composer and  instrumentist of pagode, a subgenre of samba. He was the vocalist of Exaltasamba since the band's formation, in 1982, until late February 2012, when he decided to follow a solo career.

Biography 
Péricles is a former vocalist of Exaltasamba. He's also an instrumentist and a composer. Before his musical career, he worked in two state schools as a class inspector and for a car manufacturer in São Bernardo do Campo. Péricles is the father of Lucas Morato, a singer,  and is currently married to Lidiane Santos.

Career 
In 2018, he debuted as samba-enredo interpreter, sharing the microphone of Mangueira with Ciganerey. In the same year, he created the "Canal do Periclão", a direct link with his fans on YouTube, where he discusses various topics. Péricles founded his office, Farias Produções, and since then, managed his own career. His album Em Sua Direção, launched in 2018, was nominated for a Grammy Latino in the category Best Samba/Pagode Album. The discs tour was managed by Lázaro Ramos.

Discography

Solo career

With Exaltasamba

References

External links 

 
 Péricles in the Cravo Albin Dictionary

Afro-Brazilian male singers
Portuguese-language singers
Som Livre artists
1969 births
Living people
Pagode musicians
Samba musicians